The Fisheries Monitoring Centre is a specialised unit within the Irish Naval Service responsible for sea fisheries protection and surveillance of all fishing vessels equipped with a Vessel Monitoring System. All Irish vessels operating inside and outside of the Irish EEZ are monitored by the FMC, as are all internationally registered vessels operating inside the Irish EEZ.

The FMC has responsibility for operating the Irish Vessel Monitoring System (VMS), an information communications system that tracks vessels via satellite.

History 
The Fisheries Monitoring Centre was originally established as the National Supervisory Centre (NSC) in the mid-1980s. Its introduction was in response to an effort to create a more automated and accurate system for the monitoring of fisheries data. Prior to this data on vessels operating at sea was paper-based. Such data included sightings, boardings, warnings and detention of vessels. The creation of the NSC was therefore created as a single point for the processing of all fisheries activity in the Irish EEZ.

In 1998 a Europe-wide scheme for the installation of transponder boxes in fishing vessels was initiated and with it an effort to modernise fisheries protection in Ireland. With that the NSC became the FMC in 1999.

References

Irish Naval Service
Military of the Republic of Ireland